LaVern Ralph "Lavvie" Dilweg (November 1, 1903 – January 2, 1968) was a professional football player, attorney, and U.S. Congressman from Wisconsin.

Football
Born and raised in Milwaukee, Dilweg attended its public schools and graduated from Washington High School. He enrolled at Marquette University in Milwaukee and played college football for the Golden Avalanche under head coach Frank Murray. A three-sport college athlete, he played center on the basketball team and was a shot putter on the track team. Dilweg was an All-American end, and played in the first East–West Shrine Game in San Francisco in late 1925. The Golden Avalanche had a record of 28–4–1 during Dilweg's four years.

After two undergraduate years at Marquette, Dilweg had enrolled in the MU law school, and was admitted to the Wisconsin Bar in 1927. While in law school in 1926, he played professionally for the Milwaukee Badgers, an NFL team in its fifth year that folded before the end of the season. While practicing law in Green Bay, he continued to play pro football, he signed with the Green Bay Packers in August 1927 and played through the 1934 season, with football in the morning and afternoons at the law office. Dilweg was recognized as one of the best ends in the NFL during the late 1920s and early 1930s and the Packers won three consecutive NFL championships in 1929, 1930, and 1931.  Dilweg was a football official in the Big Ten Conference until his move to Washington, D.C. in early 1943.

Dilweg played in 107 games (out of a possible total of 113) while starting 72 of them. Records are incomplete, but they show Dilweg having 12 touchdowns with 23 receptions on 443 yards. Considered the best all-around end in pro football prior to Don Hutson, Dilweg was named to the NFL 1920s All-Decade Team, and is only one of two players on the list not in the Pro Football Hall of Fame. He was named consensus All-Pro for five consecutive years, with four of those years being unanimous All-Pro.   In 2005, he was named to the Professional Football Researchers Association Hall of Very Good in the association's second HOVG class  and his candidacy for induction into the Professional Football Hall of Fame is one of four candidacies that the PFRA officially supports.

Political career
During World War II, Dilweg was elected to Congress in 1942 as a Democrat from the 8th district. He announced his candidacy in late July, less than four months before the election, and defeated incumbent Joshua Johns. He served in the 78th United States Congress (January 3, 1943 – January 3, 1945), but was not re-elected in 1944, defeated by John Byrnes, who went on to serve 28 years in the seat. Dilweg resumed the practice of law in Green Bay and Washington, and was confirmed as a member of the Foreign Claims Settlement Commission in 1961, appointed by President Kennedy.

Death
Ill for several months after surgery, Dilweg was on vacation with his wife in Florida in early 1968 when he died in St. Petersburg, where they had been visiting friends. His death came just two days after the famous Ice Bowl game at Green Bay on New Year's Eve. Dilweg is interred at the Fort Howard Cemetery in Green Bay.

Personal
Dilweg's wife, Eleanor Coleman Dilweg (1906–1978) was an Olympic swimmer from Milwaukee and a former world record holder. They met at Marquette, married in 1927, and had three sons. Son Gary (b. 1937) graduated from the U.S. Naval Academy and served in the U.S. Marines, and later in the Wisconsin legislature as a Republican from Green Bay.

Grandson Anthony Dilweg was an NFL quarterback from 1989 to 1991, with the Packers and Los Angeles Raiders. He played college football at Duke under head coach Steve Spurrier.

Dilweg was an initiated Freemason, Knight Templar and Shriner.

References

External links
 
 
 
 Marquette University, Raynor Memorial Libraries – digital archives – LaVern Dilweg

1903 births
1968 deaths
20th-century American lawyers
20th-century American politicians
American athlete-politicians
American football ends
American Freemasons
Democratic Party members of the United States House of Representatives from Wisconsin
College football officials
Green Bay Packers players
Lawyers from Washington, D.C.
Milwaukee Badgers players
Marquette Golden Avalanche football players
Marquette University Law School alumni
Wisconsin lawyers
Players of American football from Milwaukee